Sultan Ismail Nasiruddin Shah ibni Almarhum Sultan Haji Zainal Abidin III Mu’azzam Shah  (27 January 1907 – 20 September 1979) was the fourth Yang di-Pertuan Agong of Malaysia and the sixteenth Sultan of Terengganu.

Early career 
The date of his birth has been given as either 16 March 1906 or as 24 January 1907, the latter being the one more often used.  Born  in Kuala Terengganu, he was the fifth, but third surviving,  son of Sultan Zainal Abidin III ibni Sultan Ahmad II (reigned 1881–1918). His mother was a Thai Muslim convert, Cik Maimuna binti Abdullah, who died in 1918.

Educated at the Kuala Terengganu Malay School, he then went to the Malay College.  In 1929, he entered the Terengganu administrative service.  In 1934, he was appointed Assistant Collector of Land Revenue in Kuala Terengganu.

In 1935, he became aide-de-camp to his elder half brother Sultan Sulaiman, accompanying him to the coronation of King George VI on 12 May 1937.  In 1939, he became Registrar of the High Court and the Court of Appeal.  He also served as the Land Court Registrar.  In 1940, he was appointed a minister of the Terengganu state cabinet, having been made Tengku Sri Paduka Raja. In 1941, he became First Class Magistrate and was promoted Terengganu State Secretary on 15 November 1941.

Succession dispute 
Sultan Sulaiman Badrul Alam Shah of Terengganu died on 25 September 1942 of blood poisoning. The Japanese Military Administration, which occupied Malaya at that time, proclaimed his son as the fifteenth Sultan of Terengganu bearing the title Sultan Ali Shah. On 18 October 1943, the Thai government under prime minister Field Marshal Plaek Pibulsonggram took over the administration of Terengganu from the Japanese and continued to recognise Sultan Ali Shah.

When the British returned after the end of World War II, they declined to recognise Sultan Ali Shah. Allegedly, Sultan Ali was too much in debt and had been too close to the Japanese during their occupation. According to Sultan Ali, the British Military Administration wanted him removed for his refusal to sign the Malayan Union treaty.

The British Military Administration also disapproved of Sultan Ali's character, where he was said to have repudiated his official consort, Tengku Seri Nila Utama Pahang (the daughter of Sultan Abu Bakar of Pahang) and had contracted an unsuitable second marriage to a former prostitute.

On 5 November 1945 the Terengganu State Council of thirteen members announced the dismissal of Sultan Ali and the appointment of Tengku Ismail as the fifteenth Sultan of Terengganu. Tengku Ismail became known as Sultan Ismail Nasiruddin Shah and was installed on 6 June 1949 at Istana Maziah, Kuala Terengganu. Sultan Ismail's descendants have since ruled Terengganu.

Sultan Ali continued to dispute his dismissal until his death on 17 May 1996.

Deputy Yang di-Pertuan Agong 
Sultan Ismail served as Deputy Yang di-Pertuan Agong between 21 September 1960 to 20 September 1965.

Yang di-Pertuan Agong 
Sultan Ismail was elected the fourth Yang di-Pertuan Agong of Malaysia and served in that office from 21 September 1965 until 20 September 1970.

Sultan Ismail's reign was at a time when Malaysia began to be active in making its presence felt in the international arena, having secured a more solid foundation and confidence as a Federation of Malay States, Sabah and Sarawak. There were many visits by important world and South East Asian leaders, including US President Lyndon B Johnson, West German President Lubke, King Faisal of Saudi Arabia, Shah of Iran, Emperor Haile Selassie of Ethiopia, Ferdinand Marcos of the Philippines, General Ne Win of Burma and Prime Minister Nguyen Cao Ky of South Vietnam. The security of the country was more secure during his reign as the Konfrontasi with Indonesia ended and the Philippines sought normal relations (after its claim of Sabah) with Malaysia.   Due to health reasons he wanted to resign as Yang di-Pertuan Agong in 1969, but was persuaded by Prime Minister Tunku Abdul Rahman not to do so as the next Yang di-Pertuan Agong would be Tunku Abdul Rahman's nephew (Tuanku Abdul Halim of Kedah) and the Tunku felt it was not right for him to continue in office during that time.  In his farewell speech at the end of his and Sultan Ismail's term as Yang Di Pertuan Agong, Tunku Abdul Rahman declared that the event signified "the end of the first chapter of Malaysia's history".

Sultan Ismail was reigning as Yang di-Pertuan Agong when the May 13 incident sparked racial riots in Kuala Lumpur and parliament was suspended.  Despite this unfortunate event Tunku Abdul Rahman described Sultan Ismail's reign as "a most eventful and glorious one".  Sultan Ismail launched the Rukun Negara, the Malaysian declaration of national philosophy on 31 August 1970.

Death and funeral 
Sultan Ismail died at Istana Badariah, Padang Seri Negara, Mukim Batu Burok, Kuala Terengganu on 20 September 1979 after suffering from two heart attacks and was buried a day later at the Abidin Mosque, Royal Mausoleum, Kuala Terengganu. He was succeeded by Sultan Mahmud Al-Muktafi Billah Shah, his eldest son.  He died exactly nine years later after his tenure as Yang di Pertuan Agong ended on 20th September 1970.

Family and personal life 
Sultan Ismail married four times:

 Che Wan Aminah binti Che Wan Chik, by whom he had two daughters
 in 1929 to Tengku Tengah Zaharah binti Tengku Setia Raja Pahang Tengku Umar bin Sultan Ahmad Pahang (1911–1979; divorced) by whom he had eight children including his successor as sultan of Terengganu, Sultan Mahmud
 in 1944 to Tengku Intan Zaharah binti Tengku Setia Raja Terengganu Tengku Hitam Umar (1928-2015) sometime Tengku Ampuan Besar of Terengganu, Raja Permaisuri Agong and eventually made Tengku Ampuan Tua of Terengganu
 Che Jarah binti Abdullah, by whom he had one daughter

Ismail was an amateur photographer. His photographic works date from 1923 to 1979. A monograph of his life as photographer was written and published in August 2013 by his grandson and heir of his photograph archives, Raja Mohd Zainol Ihsan Shah.

Awards and recognitions

National and Sultanal Honours 
 
 Founding Grand Master of the Family Order of Terengganu
 Founding Grand Master of the Order of the Crown of Terengganu
  (as Yang di-Pertuan Agong) :
 Founder and Recipient of Order of the Royal House of Malaysia (born 18 April 1966)
 Grand Master (1965–1970) of the Order of the Crown of the Realm
 Founding Grand Master (15 April 1966 – 1970) of the Order of Loyalty to the Crown of Malaysia
 Grand Master (1965-1970) of the Order of the Royal Household of Malaysia
 
 Recipient of the Order of the Crown of the Realm (DMN) (1958)
  : 
  Recipient of the Royal Family Order or Star of Yunus (DK) 
  : 
  Member 1st class of the Family Order of the Crown of Indra of Pahang (DK I)
  : 
  Recipient of the Royal Family Order of Perak (DK) (1976)
  : 
  First Class of the Royal Family Order of Selangor (DK I) (1962)

Foreign Honours 
 :
 Recipient of the King George V Silver Jubilee Medal (1935)
 Recipient of the King George VI Coronation Medal (1937)
 Companion of the Order of St Michael and St George (CMG) (1948)
 Honorary Knight Commander of the Order of St Michael and St George (KCMG) - Sir (1951)
 Recipient of the Queen Elizabeth II Coronation Medal (1953)
 : 
 Grand Collar of the Order of Sikatuna (GCS) (1966)
 : 
 Grand Cross Special Class of the Bundesverdienstkreuz (1966)
 : 
 Recipient of the  Grand Order of Mugunghwa (1966)
 : 
 Collar of the Order of the Chrysanthemum (1968)
 : 
 Collar of the Order of Pahlavi (1968)
 : 
 Grand Cordon with Collar of the Order of the Queen of Sheba (1968)
 : 
 1st Class of the Star of the Republic of Indonesia

Places named after him
Several places were named after him, including:

 Jalan Sultan Ismail, formerly known as Treacher Road in Kuala Lumpur
 Sultan Ismail LRT Station in Kuala Lumpur
 Jalan Sultan Ismail in Kuala Terengganu, Terengganu
 Sultan Ismail Nasiruddin Shah Stadium in Kuala Terengganu, Terengganu
 SK Sultan Ismail, a primary school in Kemaman, Terengganu
 SM Agama Sultan Ismail, a secondary school in Dungun, Terengganu
 SMK Sultan Ismail 1, a secondary school in Kemaman, Terengganu
 SMK Sultan Ismail II, a secondary school in Kemaman, Terengganu
 SMK Nasiruddin Shah, a secondary school in Besut, Terengganu
 Sultan Ismail Power Station in Paka, Terengganu

Notes 

Monarchs of Malaysia
Ismail Nasiruddin
1907 births
1979 deaths
Ismail Nasiruddin
Malaysian people of Malay descent
Ismail Nasiruddin
Malaysian Muslims
Malaysian people of Thai descent

Recipients of the Darjah Kerabat Diraja Malaysia

Honorary Knights Commander of the Order of St Michael and St George
Grand Crosses Special Class of the Order of Merit of the Federal Republic of Germany
People from British Malaya
20th-century Malaysian politicians
Recipients of the Order of the Crown of the Realm
Recipients of orders, decorations, and medals of Ethiopia